Neil David Levin (September 16, 1954 – September 11, 2001) was an American businessman and political figure who was executive director of the Port Authority of New York and New Jersey from April 2001 until his death during the September 11 attacks on the World Trade Center later that year.

Early life
Neil David Levin was a native of Brooklyn.

Career
In February 1995, Levin was appointed by New York Gov. George Pataki to serve as the state's Superintendent of Banks. He took over from acting Superintendent Carmine M. Tenga. In this role, Levin was the state's chief banking regulator, head of the Department of Banking, and Chairman of the State Banking Board. He was succeeded by Elizabeth McCaul as Superintendent of Banks. In 1997, Pataki named Levin as the state Superintendent of Insurance, which made him the state's chief insurance regulator. Pataki also named him the Chairman of the Commission on the Recovery of Holocaust Victims' Assets, which arranged for the return of assets to families in New York.

In early 2001, Pataki and then New Jersey Gov. Donald DiFrancesco named Levin as the executive director of the Port Authority. In this role he was the chief executive officer of the agency which runs the World Trade Center, various bridges and tunnels around New York City, the three airports in the New York City area, the seaports in New York and New Jersey, and various international trade programs. Levin was executive director for five months before his death.

September 11 attacks and death
Levin worked in a corner office on the 67th floor of the World Trade Center's North Tower. On September 11, 2001, five days before his 47th birthday, Levin was at the Windows on the World restaurant on the 106th and 107th floors of the North Tower. When American Airlines Flight 11 was deliberately crashed into the tower between floors 93–99, all escape routes were cut off for anyone higher than the 91st floor, and Levin became one of roughly 800 people trapped in the upper floors of a burning skyscraper. It is unknown if he was killed in the fire and smoke or if he held out until the North Tower collapsed 102 minutes later.

Before the tower was struck, Levin was speaking on the phone with his executive adviser, Karen Eastman. She later related that when American Airlines Flight 11 hit the tower, "Our reaction was 'What was that?' It hit on the opposite side so we just felt the impact and the building kept shaking and swaying for a long time."

Personal life and legacy
Levin lived in Manhattan.

At the National 9/11 Memorial, Levin is memorialized at the North Pool, on Panel N-65. He is buried at Mount Lebanon Cemetery in Glendale, Queens, New York.

References

External links

 

|-

|-

1950s births
2001 deaths
Year of birth uncertain
20th-century American businesspeople
20th-century American politicians
21st-century American politicians
American terrorism victims
Assassinated American politicians
Businesspeople from New York City
Goldman Sachs people
Lafayette College alumni
Long Island University alumni
Maurice A. Deane School of Law alumni
Murdered American Jews
New York (state) Republicans
People murdered in New York City
Male murder victims
Politicians from New York City
Port Authority of New York and New Jersey people
State cabinet secretaries of New York (state)
Terrorism deaths in New York (state)
Victims of the September 11 attacks